Jiang Mianheng (born 1 April 1951) is a Chinese physicist and business executive. He has served as Vice President of the Chinese Academy of Sciences and the first President of ShanghaiTech University. His father was Jiang Zemin, General Secretary of the Chinese Communist Party and paramount leader from 1989 to 2002.

Biography
Jiang is one of the co-founders of the Shanghai-based Grace Semiconductor Manufacturing Corporation, which gained some coverage in the US press for their employment of Bush family member Neil Bush as a general consultant.   He holds a PhD in Electrical Engineering from Drexel University with a dissertation titled Point contact tunneling study of the high transition temperature superconductor Bi2Sr2CaCu2O8 in 1991, where his father went for a visit in 1997. Jiang also served as one of the head researchers for the Chinese space program. In 2007, he failed to win nomination as a delegate to the 17th Party Congress.

He served as one of the Vice Presidents in the Chinese Academy of Sciences up until November 2011, then he became President of the academy's Shanghai branch until 2015. In 2014 he was appointed president of the newly established ShanghaiTech University.

Jiang has headed a number of national research programs in alternative energy and other technologies: "coal liquefaction, electric cars, mobile phone networks, particle accelerators, spaceships, lunar satellites and liquid fluoride thorium reactor."

References

1951 births
Living people
20th-century Chinese businesspeople
21st-century Chinese businesspeople
Businesspeople from Shanghai
Children of national leaders of China
Chinese Communist Party politicians from Shanghai
Drexel University alumni
Fudan University alumni
Jiang Zemin family
People's Republic of China politicians from Shanghai
Presidents of ShanghaiTech University
Physicists from Shanghai